Gabriëlla Wammes (born 11 June 1985) is a Dutch artistic gymnast.

She competed at the 2001 World Artistic Gymnastics Championships, 2002 European Women's Artistic Gymnastics Championships, 2002 World Artistic Gymnastics Championships, and 2003 World Artistic Gymnastics Championships.

References

External links 
Gabriella Wammes 2001 Worlds Team Final Floor Exercise - justolympicgames

1985 births
Living people
Dutch female artistic gymnasts